The Zeppelin LZ 5, tactical number Z II, was a German experimental military rigid airship constructed under the direction of Ferdinand von Zeppelin. After having made numerous successful trips, LZ 5 broke loose from its moorings in a storm and subsequentely crashed on 25 April 1910.

Construction 
LZ 5 was a C-Class zeppelin built by Luftschiffbau Zeppelin in Manzell near Friedrichshafen, Germany. She was laid down in 1908 and completed by 26 May 1909. She was equipped with two Daimler engines, producing 105 hp and 77 kW each. LZ 5 had a gas volume of 15,000 m³ of hydrogen contained in the envelope of the airship. Her framework was made of the light alloy aluminium and covered by fabric skin. She was equipped with two gondolas and could carry a crew of eight.

Career 
LZ 5 conducted its first flight on 26 May 1909 at Lake Constance, Germany. After which she made a successful endurance journey from 29 May to 2 June 1909 under the command of Ludwig Dürr and carrying Ferdinand von Zeppelin and six of his employees, travelling the long distance between Lake Constance and Bitterfeld, Germany and back. Its initial goal had been to reach Berlin, but due to fuel shortage and strong headwinds, the airship had to turn back. In total LZ 5 flew for 1,194 km in 38 hours and 40 minutes. However a small incident occurred during this flight, when the airship collided with a pear tree near Göppingen, Germany, rupturing three gas cells. The damage was quickly patched up with some hop sticks and after Captain Dürr returned to the repaired ship after having gone off to buy a chocolate bar, the airship made it back to Lake Constance without further incident.

After LZ 5 was fully repaired, it was sold to the military administration in Cologne, Germany on 5 August 1909 and renamed Z II. During her relocation from Lake Constance to Cologne for her military service, the airship made a stop at the International Aviation Exhibition in Frankfurt am Main, Germany. During her time in the army, Z II made a total of 16 more trips, covering a total distance of 2,478 km.

Loss 
On 24 April 1910 Z II was travelling from Bad Homburg, Germany to Cologne, Germany when a powerful storm  arose, forcing the airship to land in an open field near Limburg an der Lahn, Germany. The airship was moored to a large farm trailer from the nearby Blumenrod farm, but the strong winds managed to break Z II loose from her moorings, after which she drifted aimlessly without crew. The airship ultimately crashed into a hill named Webersberg near Weilburg, Germany. The crash had broken the airship in two and was deemed a total loss. Z II was scrapped on site and 22 commemorative medals were minted from aluminium debris that was salvaged during the scrapping of the airship.

Specifications

References

Further reading

Brooks, Peter W. Zeppelin: Rigid Airships 1893–1940, Washington, D.C.: Smithsonian Institute Press, 1992 

Zeppelins
Accidents and incidents involving balloons and airships
Accidents and incidents involving military aircraft
Airships of the Imperial German Navy
Aviation accidents and incidents in Germany
Aviation accidents and incidents in 1910
Hydrogen airships
Airships of Germany
Airships
Aircraft first flown in 1909
Rigid airships